William Murray was a Scottish courtier, a household servant of James VI of Scotland as a "valet of the king's chamber".

According to the register of privy seal letters, he was a son of James Murray, who had been the barber of James V. Mary, Queen of Scots mentions William Murray as a barber who practiced surgery. He had served her husband Lord Darnley and was travelling to France in July 1571.

William Murray served the young James VI at Stirling Castle as a valet. The royal household was managed by Annabell Murray, Countess of Mar. Another servant, William Broig, was the king's barber. Murray was sometimes described as a "cubicular", a Latinate word for a bedchamber servant. A valet since 1569, in 1577 he was given a second appointment as a "varlet of the wardrobe".

There are several records of purchases made for James VI by Murray. In July and August 1574 he organised the decoration of the king's study or cabinet in the palace at Stirling with green paint, copper tacks, and broad green woollen cloth. In 1576 he bought bird seed for the king's parrots, supervised the construction of a bird cage from wire for the king's chamber, bought cord to hang up bird cages, and bought tennis rackets. Murray brought clothes made by the king's tailors in Edinburgh to the king at Stirling.

For New Year's Day 1579 Murray bought 24 gold rings for James VI to distribute as gifts.

In 1591 the four valets were William Murray, William Stewart, John Gibb, and John Stewart of Rosland.

Contemporaries of the same name at the Scottish court
Another William Murray was Master of Carriage to James VI, in charge of transporting the king's luggage. His wife Christian Lindsay baked the king's shortbread and oatcakes and may have been a poet.

Master William Murray, a son of William Murray of Tullibardine (died 1583) and a nephew of Annabell, Countess of Mar, was made a gentleman in the king's bedchamber in June 1580.

A third, and younger William Murray, a son of Catherine Murray, Lady Abercairny, a sister of the Countess of Mar, was a schoolroom companion of James VI at Stirling. He became a Master of Horse to Anne of Denmark.

References

Court of James VI and I
People of Stirling Castle